Ranco is a comune (municipality) on the shore of Lago Maggiore in the Province of Varese in the Italian region Lombardy, located about  northwest of Milan and about  west of Varese.

The village has a Guide Michelin acclaimed restaurant (Il sole di Ranco) and a Transport Museum. The municipality of Ranco contains the frazione (subdivision) Uponne.

Ranco borders the following municipalities: Angera, Ispra, Lesa, Meina.

Demographic evolution

References

Cities and towns in Lombardy